Chapanga Mulenga "Peter" Wilson III (February 8, 1978 – June 18, 2014) was a Tanzanian poet whose book Words by My Mood is an anthology of poetry detailing his life experiences. Born in Mbeya, he lived in Lesotho, Malawi, Tanzania and the United States. He attended the University of Houston, where he majored in Information Technology and minored in African studies. He died on June 18, 2014 in Houston, Texas.

Publications
Words by My Mood: Book of Poetry, 2005

References

 http://www.countrybookshop.co.uk/cgi-bin/search.pl?start=0&engine=extended&searchtext=&searchauthor=&scope=fuzzy&publisher=Chapanga+Wilson&bad=all&year=&go=Search

1978 births
People from Mbeya Region
Tanzanian poets
2014 deaths
University of Houston alumni
Alumni of Saint Andrews International High School
20th-century poets